is a dam in the city of Gero in Gifu Prefecture,  Japan  on the Maze River, part of the Kiso River system. The dam is a concrete gravity dam with a height of 44.5 meters. It was constructed for hydroelectric power generation and its associated power plant has a capacity of 288,000 kilowatts of power. It is managed by the Chubu Electric Power Company.

Notes

Dams in Gifu Prefecture
Hydroelectric power stations in Japan
Dams completed in 1976
Gravity dams
Energy infrastructure completed in 1976
Gero, Gifu